In algebra, a subfield of an algebra A over a field F is an F-subalgebra that is also a field. A maximal subfield is a subfield that is not contained in a strictly larger subfield of A.

If A is a finite-dimensional central simple algebra, then a subfield E of A is called a strictly maximal subfield if .

References 
 Richard S. Pierce. Associative algebras. Graduate texts in mathematics, Vol. 88, Springer-Verlag, 1982, 

Algebra